Constituency PK-36 (Swabi-VI) was a constituency for the Khyber Pakhtunkhwa Assembly of the Khyber Pakhtunkhwa province of Pakistan.

See also
 Constituency PK-31 (Swabi-I)
 Constituency PK-32 (Swabi-II)
 Constituency PK-33 (Swabi-III)
 Constituency PK-34 (Swabi-IV)
 Constituency PK-35 (Swabi-V)
 Constituency WR-19
 Constituency WR-21

References

External links 
 Khyber Pakhtunkhwa Assembly's official website
 Election Commission of Pakistan's official website
 Awaztoday.com Search Result
 Election Commission Pakistan Search Result

Khyber Pakhtunkhwa Assembly constituencies